Travis Seegmiller is an American attorney, academic, and politician who served as a member of the Utah House of Representatives from the 62nd district. Seegmiller was appointed to the House on February 14, 2018, succeeding Jon Stanard.

Education 
Seegmiller earned a Bachelor of Arts degree in Leadership Psychology and International Studies from Yale University and a Juris Doctor from the Georgetown University Law Center.

Career 
Upon graduation from law school, Seegmiller worked as an attorney and strategic consultant. He worked as a partner at Squire Patton Boggs in Washington, D.C. and as a strategic management consultant at McKinsey & Company in New York City. Seegmiller also served as a political advisor for the Mitt Romney 2012 presidential campaign. He was also a professor of law and business management at Dixie State University (now known as Utah Tech University.)

in 2018, Seegmiller was appointed to the Utah House of Representatives after the resignation of Jon Stanard amid a prostitution scandal. He secured the seat in an eight-way race within the Washington County Republican Party. He won re-election in 2020 with 99.3% of the popular vote in the general election. Seegmiller announced on May 10, 2022 his intent to resign from his position effective July 1, 2022, and withdraw his name from consideration in the June 2022 Utah Republican Primary for the same office. While he had recently faced calls to resign, his official memo credits the decision for both actions to his family relocating their residence outside of the district.

Personal life 
Seegmiller is married to Lisa Hopkins Seegmiller, a singer and actress who appeared as Mimi in Baz Luhrmann's 2002–2003 production of La bohème on Broadway, for which she received a 2003 Tony Award. Seegmiller faced criticism and calls to resign in late 2021, after he was charged with the crime of poaching, by the Utah Division of Wildlife Resources.

Awards and Recognitions
 Defender of Liberty Award by the Libertas Institute (Utah) in 2019, 2020, 2021.
 #1 Constitutional Conservative Award by Alliance for Utah's Future in 2019, 2020.
 Top Lifetime Constitutional Conservative Award by Alliance for Utah's Future in 2021.
 Friend of the Taxpayer Award by Utah Taxpayer's Association in 2021.
 Rookie Legislator of the Year Award by Keep My Voice (KMV) Awards in 2019.
 The Seagull Award by Alliance for Utah's Future in 2019.
 #1 Most Conservative by Adam Brown of BYU in 2021.
 Educator of the Year Award by Saint George Lodge No. 33, F&AM of Utah in 2017.
 Community Engaged Scholar Award by Dixie State University in 2015.
 Hottest Professor in the Nation (7th place) by Rate My Professors in 2016.

2022 sponsored legislation

References 

Utah lawyers
Yale University alumni
Georgetown University Law Center alumni
McKinsey & Company people
Utah Tech University faculty
Republican Party members of the Utah House of Representatives
Living people
Year of birth missing (living people)
21st-century American politicians